Rønningen is a Norwegian surname. Notable people with the surname include:

Bjørn Rønningen (born 1937), Norwegian writer
Børre Rønningen (born 1949), Norwegian politician
Ivar Rønningen (born 1975), Norwegian footballer
Janne Rønningen (born 1969), Norwegian comedian and television presenter
Jon Rønningen (born 1962), Norwegian sport wrestler
Jonas Rønningen (born 1990), Norwegian footballer
Lars Rønningen (born 1965), Norwegian sport wrestler

Norwegian-language surnames